Subramaniam Rajaratnam (c4 July 1884 – 12 March 1970) was a Ceylon Tamil lawyer and member of the Legislative Council of Ceylon.

Early life and family
Rajaratnam was born around 4 July 1884 in Kopay in northern Ceylon.

Rajaratnam married Achchuvely. They had three sons (Saravanabavanathan, Kathiresu and Satkunananthan) and four daughters (Kanagambigai, Yogambigai, Thilakavathy and Mangaiarkarasi).

Career
After qualifying as an advocate Rajaratnam practised law in Colombo and Jaffna.

Rajaratnam was elected to the Legislative Council of Ceylon as the member for the Northern Province Central at the 1924 election.

As its chairman, Rajaratnam played a key role in the foundation and growth of the Hindu Board which, at one time, managed more than 150 schools.

Rajaratnam died on 12 March 1970.

References

1884 births
1970 deaths
Ceylonese advocates
Members of the Legislative Council of Ceylon
People from Northern Province, Sri Lanka
People from British Ceylon
Sri Lankan Tamil lawyers
Sri Lankan Tamil politicians